Ministry of Economic Development may refer to:

Ministries
 Ministry of Economic Development, Tourism, Trade and Enterprise (Albania)
 Ministry of Economic Development (Azerbaijan)
 Ministry of Economic Development (Bashkortostan)
 Three Canadian provincial ministries:
 Ministry of Industry, Economic Development and Mines (Manitoba)
 Ministry of Economic Development, Employment and Infrastructure, in Ontario
 Ministry of Economic Development, Innovation and Export Trade, in Quebec
 Ministry of Economic Development (Colombia)
 Ministry of Finance and Economic Development (Ethiopia)
 Ministry of Economy and Sustainable Development (Georgia)
 Federal Ministry of Economic Cooperation and Development, in Germany
 Ministry of Economic Development (Italy)
 Ministry of Finance and Economic Development (Mauritius)
 Ministry of Economic Development (New Zealand)
 Ministry of Economic Development (Russia)
 Ministry of Economic Development (Sri Lanka)
 Ministry of Finance, Planning and Economic Development (Uganda)
 Ministry of Economic Development and Trade (Ukraine)

Ministers
 Minister of Economic Development and Official Languages, in Canada
 Minister of Economic Development (Isle of Man)
 Minister of Economic Development (New Zealand)
 Minister of Economic Development (South Africa)

See also
 Department of Economic Development (disambiguation)